The 14th Military Division was a division sized unit of the Vichy France army.  The division was formed in late 1940 and demobilized in late 1942.  It was under the control of the 1st Military Corps and controlled units in East France notably on the Swiss border.

History 
The 14th Military Division was organized in September 1940 under Lieutenant General Alfred-Marie-Joseph-Louis Montagne. In November 1942, the division was de-mobilised.  The division was under the command of the I Group of Military Divisions, also known as the I Military Corps.  It was headquartered in Lyon in Southern France.  In addition to the division controlling military units it also supervised the areas of the 1st Military District and 2nd Military District in addition to a security squadron and training grounds.

Organization 

Structure of the division in 1941 (names in English and French):

 Deputy Commander, 7th Military Division
 Infantry Commander, 7th Military Division
1st Infantry Regiment

3rd Mountain Infantry Half-Brigade






8/14e Groupe de Transmissions - (8/14th Signals Battalion)
14e Compagnie de Supply - (14th Supply Company)
Commandement Militaire de Department - (Military Departments Command)
Commandement Militaire de Department de Rhone (Military Department Command of Rhone)
Commandement Militaire de Department de Drôme (Military Department Command of Drôme)
Commandement Militaire de Department de Isère (Military Department Command of Isère)
Commandement Militaire de Department de Haute-Savoie (Military Department Command of Haute-Savoie)
Commandement Militaire de Department de Hautes-Alpes (Military Department Command of Hautes-Alpes)
Commandement Militaire de Department de Savoie (Military Department Command of Savoie)
Commandement de District Militaire - (Military Districts Command)
Commandement de District Militaire de Saint-Julien (Military Department Command of Saint-Julien)
Commandement de District Militaire de Bonneville (Military Department Command of Bonneville)
Commandement de District Militaire de Thonon (Military Department Command of Thonon)
Commandement de District Militaire de Albertville (Military Department Command of Albertville)
Commandement de District Militaire de Saint-Jean-de-Maurienne (Military Department Command of Saint-Jean-de-Maurienne)
Commandement de District Militaire de Briançon (Military Department Command of Briançon)
Commandement de District Militaire de Barcelonnette (Military Department Command of Barcelonnette)
Chamerand Training Group (Groupe d'Entrainement Chamerand)
1er Régiment de Garde de la Légion - (1st Legion Guard Regiment)
Headquarters - Lyon
1er Bataillon
Headquarters - Lyon
1er Escadron - Reconnaissance
2e Escadron - Infantry
3e Escadron - Motorcycle
2e Bataillon
Headquarters - Annecy
5e Escadron - Motorcycle
6e Escadron - Reconnaissance
7e Escadron - Infantry
8e Escadron - Infantry

References 

Military units and formations disestablished in 1942 
Military units and formations established in 1940
Divisions of Vichy France